The Istra is a river in Rauma Municipality in Møre og Romsdal county, Norway. The river runs through the Isterdalen valley before emptying into the Rauma river in the Romsdalen valley. The river has its source inside Reinheimen National Park.

The river was protected in the Conservation Plan III and later in the Conservation Plan IV. The Norwegian County Road 63 and the famous Trollstigen road both follow the river.

References

Rivers of Møre og Romsdal
Rauma, Norway
Rivers of Norway